Collita griseola, the dingy footman, is a moth of the family Erebidae. The species was first described by Jacob Hübner in 1803. It is found in Europe and North and South-East Asia.

The wingspan is 32–40 mm. The moth flies from May to August depending on the location.

The larvae feed on lichen.

This species has shown a spectacular increase in abundance in Britain during the period 1968 to 2007, like a number of moth species with larva that feed on lichens and algae. In Britain it was originally limited to southern fens and marshy areas, but has since spread northwards and now occupy a variety of habitats, including gardens.

Subspecies
 Collita griseola griseola
 Collita griseola sachalinensis (Matsumura, 1930) (Russian Far East)
 Collita griseola submontana (Inoue, 1982) (Japan)

References

External links

Eilema griseola at Lepiforum e.V.

Lithosiina
Moths described in 1803
Moths of Asia
Moths of Europe
Moths of Japan
Insects of Turkey
Taxa named by Jacob Hübner